Fish head curry is a Singaporean dish deriving from a hybrid of Indian and Chinese ethnic cuisines. The head of a red snapper is stewed in a curry with assorted vegetables such as okra and eggplants. It is usually served with either rice or bread, or as a shared dish.

Description

Origins
Fish head curry was invented in Singapore when a chef from the state of Kerala named M.J. Gomez, who was living in the country, wanted to bring South Indian cuisine to local diners. He started a restaurant called Gomez Curry, which was located at Sophia Road and eventually at 9 Selegie Road, both located within the Rochor district in the Central Region.

Although fish head was not widely served in the Indian subcontinent, Chinese customers considered Fish head casserole as a special delicacy, and so Gomez had the idea of cooking the fish in curry instead, as well as his own ingredients, therefore formulating a new dish.

Today, restaurants of all races in the country all serve variations of this dish. Fish head curry has become a popular dish among Singaporeans and tourists alike. Costing between S$10 to S$20, it is generally not considered cheap hawker fare. It typically comes served in a clay pot, and is often sold at hawker centers and neighbourhood food stalls.

Preparation
Tamarind (asam) juice is frequently added to the gravy to give the dish a sweet-sour flavor (see asam fish). This variety of fish head curry also has a thinner, orange gravy.

Coconut milk can be added to this dish.

See also

 Singaporean cuisine
 Chilli crab – another Singaporean seafood dish
 Malabar matthi curry
 Fish head casserole
 Fish amok
 Fish stew
 Fish curry (disambiguation)

References 

Singaporean cuisine
Peranakan cuisine
Singaporean fusion cuisine
Chinese fusion cuisine
Indian fusion cuisine
Southeast Asian curries
Fish stews